Dave Bennett (born 21 November 1938) is a former professional footballer who played as a right-back for Aberdeen.

Bennett played youth football with Sunnybank before starting his professional career with Aberdeen in 1960. After six years at Aberdeen, he left to join Inverness Caledonian.

References

External links

1938 births
Living people
Scottish footballers
Scottish Football League players
Aberdeen F.C. players
Association football fullbacks
Caledonian F.C. players
Footballers from Aberdeen